The 2007 BAFL Season is the British American Football League. BritBowl XXI, the league's championship game, was scheduled to be played at Keepmoat Stadium in Doncaster on September 23, 2007.

Schedule

Regular season

Formula 
Based on the British American Football League, setup for the 2007 season there will be a 3 tier structure consisting of:

Final regular season standings 

W = Wins, L = Losses, T = Ties, PCT = Winning Percentage, PF= Points For, PA = Points Against

Clinched playoff seeds are marked in parentheses and shaded in green, for BAFL 2 divisions the colours have been changed to indicate Northern and Southern sides of the Playoffs.

BAFL Premier standings

BAFL Division 1 standings

Playoffs 
BritBowl XXI will then be played on September 23, 2007 at Don Valley Stadium, Sheffield

BAFL Premier Playoff

BAFL Premier Championship Game/BritBowl

BAFL 1 Playoff

BAFL 1 Championship Game

See also 
BritBowl

British American Football League
BAFL season
BAFL season